Nessmuk Lake, also known as Lake Nessmuk, is an reservoir located in Tioga County, Pennsylvania, near the borough of Wellsboro. The lake is owned by the Commonwealth of Pennsylvania and is managed by the Fish and Boat Commission for the public use of fishing and boating in the lake. The borough of Wellsboro is responsible for caring and maintaining the lake. Commonwealth Inland Waters regulations apply for all living fish due to its use as a warmwater fishery. Boating is limited to electric boats and unpowered boats.

The lake is located along PA route 287, one mile south of Wellsboro.

References

Reservoirs in Pennsylvania
Geography of Tioga County, Pennsylvania